That's Right – You're Wrong is a 1939 American musical film directed by David Butler and released by RKO Radio Pictures. The film stars Kay Kyser and his band, with a cast that included Adolphe Menjou, Lucille Ball, Edward Everett Horton, Roscoe Karns, and Ginny Simms (as herself). It was the first film to feature Kyser and his band, and its success led to their headlining several more pictures over the next five years. The title was a Kyser catchphrase, used on his radio show when a contestant correctly gave a wrong answer to a "right or wrong" question.

Plot
Four Star Studios is suffering a slump at the box office, and studio head Forbes, noting the enormous popularity of Kyser's band on radio and in concert, decides to sign them up to star in a movie. But to the band's disappointment, Kyser turns down the offer, believing he should "stay in his own backyard." Their manager, Deems, manages to change his mind, and they head off to Hollywood. Upon arrival, they're greeted by their producer, Delmore, and fast-talking press agent Stamp. Deems has rented an enormous house for them to live in, which upsets the thrifty Kyser until he finds that his beloved Grandma has been brought out to live in and run the place.

At the studio, things quickly take a bad turn, as top screenwriters Village and Cook realize that Kyser's unprepossessing looks and personality don't exactly fit the mold of the dashing romantic lead most movies require. After over 40 failed attempts to come up with an acceptable story, they tell Delmore it's hopeless. Fearful of being fired, the producer figures the only way out of this situation is to get Kyser to quit. He tells the bandleader that his girl, vocalist Ginny, will be replaced by rising star Sandra Sand. It appears to do the trick until the writers, feeling sorry for putting Kyser in this spot, concoct a way for him to put a monkey wrench in Delmore's scheme.

Cast
 Kay Kyser as Kay Kyser
 Adolphe Menjou as Stacey Delmore
 May Robson as Grandma
 Lucille Ball as Sandra Sand
 Dennis O'Keefe as Chuck Deems, the Band Manager
 Edward Everett Horton as Tom Village, a Screenwriter
 Roscoe Karns as Mal Stamp
 Moroni Olsen as Jonathan 'J.D.' Forbes
 Hobart Cavanaugh as Dwight Cook, a Screenwriter
 Kay Kyser Band as Kay Kyser's Band (as Kay Kyser's Band)
 Ginny Simms as Ginny Simms – Band Singer
 Harry Babbitt as Harry Babbitt
 Sully Mason as Sully Mason
 Merwyn Bogue as Ish Kabibble
 Hedda Hopper as herself
 Sheilah Graham as herself
 Erskine Johnson as himself 	
 Harrison Carroll as himself
 Feg Murray as himself
 Charles Judels as Luigi

Music
In addition to Kay Kyser's theme song, "(I’ve Grown So Lonely) Thinking of You" (music and lyrics by Walter Donaldson and Paul Ash), the movie included the following songs: 
 "The Answer is Love"  (music by Sam H. Stept, lyrics by Charles Newmansung, sung by Ginny Simms, Harry Babbitt, and Sully Mason, with a guest appearance by Ish Kabibble)
 "Chatterbox" (music by Jerome (Jerry) Brainin, lyrics by Allan Roberts)
 "California, Here I Come" (written by Al Jolson, Buddy G. DeSylva, and Joseph Meyer)
 "The Little Red Fox" (sung by Ginny Simms)
 "The Volga Boatman"
 "Happy Birthday to Love" (music and lyrics by Dave Franklin, sung by Ginny Simms)
 "Fit to be Tied" (music and lyrics by Walter Donaldson)
 "My Mammy" (music by Walter Donaldson, lyrics by Sam Lewis and Joe Young)

Reception
The film was popular and earned a profit of $219,000.

References

External links

 
 
 
 

1939 films
1939 musical films
Films directed by David Butler
American black-and-white films
American musical films
Films scored by Roy Webb
RKO Pictures films
1930s English-language films
1930s American films